Hugo Eugenio Ballesteros Reyes (3 January 1931 – 7 April 2019) was a Chilean politician and diplomat.

Born in Santiago, he studied law at the Universidad de Chile's campus in Valparaíso. He served as a member of the Chamber of Deputies (1957–1969) and the Senate (1969–1973). In 1964 he was also a member of his country's delegation to the United Nations General Assembly.

Ballesteros Reyes died of brain cancer in Valparaíso, at the age of 88.

References

1931 births
2019 deaths
Politicians from Santiago
Chilean people of Spanish descent
Chilean Roman Catholics
National Falange politicians
Christian Democratic Party (Chile) politicians
Presidents of the Chamber of Deputies of Chile
Deputies of the XLIII Legislative Period of the National Congress of Chile
Deputies of the XLIV Legislative Period of the National Congress of Chile
Deputies of the XLV Legislative Period of the National Congress of Chile
Senators of the XLVI Legislative Period of the National Congress of Chile
Senators of the XLVII Legislative Period of the National Congress of Chile
Permanent Representatives of Chile to the United Nations
University of Valparaíso alumni
Deaths from brain cancer in Chile